Célestin Charles Alfred Bouglé (1 June 1870 – 25 January 1940) was a French philosopher known for his role as one of Émile Durkheim's collaborators and a member of the L'Année Sociologique.

Life

Bouglé was born in Saint-Brieuc, Côtes-du-Nord. He entered the École Normale Supérieure in 1890 and aggregated in philosophy in 1893. He was, along with Xavier Léon, Élie Halévy, Léon Brunschvicg and Dominique Parodi, one of the founding members of the journal Revue de Métaphysique et de Morale. In 1896 he joined with Durkheim and became one of the first editors of the Année Sociologique. He received his doctorate in 1899.

After teaching in Saint-Brieuc, Montpellier, and Toulouse he took a position at the Sorbonne in 1908, the same year that Essay on the Caste System (his best-known work) appeared. He became the director of the École Normale Supérieure in 1935 until 1940. He died in Paris in 1940.

Influence

Bouglé was one of French anthropologist Louis Dumont's foremost inspirations when it came to seeing Indian castes (in the spirit of the Année Sociologique) not just as elements making up a whole, but forming an ideological system (that of the Varnas, not the numerous Jatis) that in meaning and scope surpasses the sum of the elements.

Works 

 Essais sur le régime des castes (Essays on the caste system; published in English as "Essays on the Caste System by Celestin Bougle" with a translation by D. F. Pocock in 1971 by Cambridge University Press)
 Leçons de sociologie sur l’évolution des valeurs (Sociological lessons on the evolution of values, 1926; published in English as The Evolution of Values: Studies in Sociology with Special Applications to Teaching)

External links
 
 

1870 births
1940 deaths
Writers from Saint-Brieuc
École Normale Supérieure alumni
French sociologists
French male non-fiction writers